The 2012 Victoria Cup was a cancelled rugby tournament, originally scheduled to be played  in June and July 2012 as the third Victoria Cup involving the national teams from Zimbabwe, Kenya and Uganda.

The tournament was cancelled after Uganda withdrew due to financial difficulties, and was not revived until 2019. The only fixtures played in 2012 were the home and away Elgon Cup matches between Kenya and Uganda. All fixtures involving Zimbabwe were cancelled.

Schedule
The original schedule was for home and away fixtures in a double round-robin involving all three teams.

References

2012
2012 in African rugby union
2012 rugby union tournaments for national teams
2012 in Kenyan sport
2012 in Ugandan sport
2012 in Zimbabwean sport